James Purdon Lewes Thomas, 1st Viscount Cilcennin, KStJ PC (pronounced "Kilkennin"; 13 October 1903 – 13 July 1960), sometimes known as Jim Thomas, was a British Conservative politician. He served as First Lord of the Admiralty between 1951 and 1956.

Background and education
James Purdon Lewes Thomas was the son of John Lewes Thomas, JP, of Cae-glas, Llandeilo, Carmarthenshire, and Anne Louisa, daughter of Commander George Purdon RN of  Tinerana House, County Clare and Anne Caulfield. He was educated at Rugby and Oriel College, Oxford, where he was awarded an aegrotat degree in French in 1926 (indicating that he was unable to sit the final examinations due to ill-health).

Political career
Thomas was private secretary to Stanley Baldwin, the leader of the Conservative Party, between 1929 and 1931. In the 1929 general election he stood for election as Member of Parliament for Llanelly (now Llanelli), but was unsuccessful. In the 1931 general election he was elected as Member of Parliament for Hereford, which he held until 1955. He was Parliamentary Private Secretary (PPS) to the Dominions Secretary, James Henry Thomas, between 1932 and 1935, to the Colonial Secretary, Thomas and from 1936 William Ormsby-Gore, between 1935 and 1937, and to the Foreign Secretary, Anthony Eden, between 1937 and Eden's resignation in 1938.

Thomas volunteered for military service at the outbreak of the Second World War in 1939, but was rejected due to a permanent knee injury. From 1940 to 1943 he was a government whip. In 1943 Churchill appointed Thomas Financial Secretary to the Admiralty, which he remained until 1945.

After the 1945 general election Thomas was the opposition spokesman on naval affairs and deputy chairman of the Conservative Party, where he was responsible for recommending parliamentary candidates.

When Churchill returned as Prime Minister following the 1951 general election, Thomas was sworn of the Privy Council and appointed First Lord of the Admiralty. He left the House of Commons in 1955 and was raised to the peerage as Viscount Cilcennin, of Hereford in the County of Hereford, in early 1956 (the title was pronounced "Kilkennin"). He continued as First Lord of the Admiralty until September 1956, when he resigned.

After resigning as First Lord of the Admiralty, Lord Cilcennin accompanied the Duke of Edinburgh on a world tour in 1956 and 1957, during which the duke opened the 1956 Summer Olympics in Melbourne.

In 1957 he was appointed Lord-Lieutenant of Herefordshire, a post he held until his death three years later. In 1958 he was appointed a knight of the Order of Saint John (KStJ).

In retirement, he served on the boards of several companies and as chairman of Television Wales and the West (TWW), the commercial television contractor for South Wales and the West of England.

Personal life
Lord Cilcennin never married. He died in July 1960, aged 56, when the title became extinct. He suffered from arthritis of the hip in later life.

Three months after his death his book Admiralty House, Whitehall was published, about Admiralty House which had been his official residence as First Lord of the Admiralty.

Arms

References

External links 
Liddell Hart Centre for Military Archives: THOMAS, James Purdon Lewes
 

 

1903 births
1960 deaths
Admiralty personnel of World War II
Cilcennin, James Purdon Lewes, 1st Viscount
Conservative Party (UK) MPs for English constituencies
First Lords of the Admiralty
Cilcennin, James Purdon Lewes, 1st Viscount
Members of the Privy Council of the United Kingdom
Ministers in the Churchill wartime government, 1940–1945
Cilcennin, James Purdon Lewes, 1st Viscount
UK MPs 1931–1935
UK MPs 1935–1945
UK MPs 1945–1950
UK MPs 1950–1951
UK MPs 1951–1955
UK MPs 1955–1959
UK MPs who were granted peerages
Ministers in the Churchill caretaker government, 1945
Ministers in the third Churchill government, 1951–1955
Ministers in the Eden government, 1955–1957
Viscounts created by Elizabeth II
Lords of the Admiralty